Scott Clark was a comic book artist who worked for Wildstorm, Marvel Comics, Aspen Comics and DC Comics.

Career
Scott Clark got his start in the early 1990s drawing for small publishers but came to be known through his work for the then Image studio Wildstorm and later Marvel Comics. After working for a short time at Aspen Comics, he returned to the now DC Comics-owned Wildstorm and then DC Comics proper, working on titles like Brightest Day. Most recently he worked on the New 52 Grifter series and covers for Deathstroke and was the artist for the Martian Manhunter back-up in the new Justice League of America series.

Clark died on February 21, 2013.

References

2013 deaths
American comics artists
Year of birth missing